Loyola University School of Law may refer to more than one entry of Jesuit law school:

Loyola University New Orleans College of Law
Loyola University Chicago School of Law
Loyola Law School, at Loyola Marymount University in Los Angeles